Ferruccio Zambonini (17 December 1880 – 12 January 1932) was an Italian mineralogist and geologist. Most of his time he worked on the geology and mineralogy of Mount Vesuvius.

Life and work
Zambonini was born in Rome and studied at the university there. From 1906 on he worked in the Mineralogical Museum at the University of Naples. In 1909 he changed to the University of Sassari, but he returned to Naples in 1926, where he held a chair for general chemistry.

Honours

The minerals Ferruccite and Zamboninite were named after him.

References
Ferruccio Zambonini
University of Manitoba- 2002 Annual Report

External links
 

20th-century Italian geologists
Italian mineralogists
1932 deaths
1880 births